Italo Petriccione is a multi-award winning Italian cinematographer who has worked with directors such as Gabriele Salvatores, Paolo Virzì, and Leonardo Pieraccioni, during a career spanning more than three decades. He has been nominated six times for both the David di Donatello for Best Cinematography and the Nastro d'Argento for Best Cinematography, winning both awards for the film adaptation of I'm Not Scared.

Selected filmography

Awards
 David di Donatello for Best Cinematography (2004)
 Nastro d'Argento for Best Cinematography (2003)

References

External links
 

Living people
Italian cinematographers
Place of birth missing (living people)
1958 births
David di Donatello winners
Nastro d'Argento winners